The Lucerne Symphony Orchestra is a Swiss orchestra based in Lucerne. The Luzerner SInfonieorchester is the orchestra-in-residence of the renowned Lucerne Culture and Congress Centre (KKL Luzern). It also acts as the opera orchestra of the Lucerne Theatre.

History
The precursor ensemble to the Lucerne Symphony Orchestra was founded in 1806, and had the name  (General Music Society of Lucerne). The orchestra has commissioned new compositions from such composers as David Philip Hefti (Klangbogen) and Wolfgang Rihm (Nähe Fern).

James Gaffigan, chief conductor of the orchestra from 2011 to 2021, made several commercial recordings with the orchestra for Harmonia Mundi.

In 2010, Michael Sanderling first guest-conducted the Lucerne Symphony Orchestra. In November 2019, the orchestra announced the appointment of Sanderling as its next chief conductor, effective with the 2021–2022 season.

Chief Conductors
 Willem Mengelberg (1892–1895)
 Max Sturzenegger (1939–1960)
 Ulrich Meyer-Schoellkopf (1972–1990)
 Marcello Viotti (1987–1992)
 Olaf Henzold  (1992–1997)
 Jonathan Nott (1997–2002)
 Christian Arming (2002–2004)
 John Axelrod (2004–2009)
 James Gaffigan (2011–2021)
 Michael Sanderling (2021–present)

See also
 Lucerne Festival Orchestra
Lucerne Culture and Congress Centre (KKL Luzern)

References

External links
 Official German-language home page of the Lucerne Symphony Orchestra

Swiss orchestras
Lucerne
Musical groups established in the 1800s
1800s establishments in Switzerland
Organizations established in 1806